Nicolás Pantaleone (born 18 February 1993) is an Argentine professional footballer who plays as a left-back for Tristán Suárez.

Career
Pantaleone began with River Plate. He featured once for the U20s at the 2012 U-20 Copa Libertadores, which River Plate won, against Corinthians. For the first-team, he was an unused substitute for a Copa Argentina defeat to Estudiantes of Primera B Metropolitana in April 2013. On 2 August 2014, Pantaleone departed River Plate to join Tigre. He made his professional debut in an Argentine Primera División match with Belgrano on 23 November. After three seasons and just three appearances in total for the club, Pantaleone left and subsequently joined Olimpo in 2016. He scored his first goal on 27 May 2017 versus Newell's Old Boys.

He left Olimpo on 16 May 2018. In the succeeding June, Pantaleone signed for Patronato. A total of fifteen appearances followed in 2018–19 for them, prior to Pantaleone leaving to go abroad for the first time after agreeing terms with Uruguayan Primera División side Danubio. His bow arrived on 1 August, as he appeared for the full duration of a home loss to Montevideo-based River Plate.

Career statistics
.

Honours
River Plate
U-20 Copa Libertadores: 2012

References

External links

1993 births
Living people
Footballers from Buenos Aires
Argentine footballers
Association football defenders
Argentine expatriate footballers
Expatriate footballers in Uruguay
Argentine expatriate sportspeople in Uruguay
Argentine Primera División players
Uruguayan Primera División players
Club Atlético River Plate footballers
Club Atlético Tigre footballers
Olimpo footballers
Club Atlético Patronato footballers
Danubio F.C. players
CSyD Tristán Suárez footballers
Club Atlético Atlanta footballers